Populated places in Formentera
Sant Ferran de ses Roques is a village on the island Formentera, Balearic Islands, Spain and one of the three parishes of the island.

Sant Ferran is located in the middle of the island, at the crossroads of PM-820, the main road of the island, and PM-820-2, between the towns of Sant Francesc Xavier, Es Pujols and El Pilar de la Mola.